James Lord is an American bobsledder who competed in the mid-1960s. A NY State Forest Ranger at the time, Lord was brakeman on a sled piloted by Fred Fortune of Lake Placid who won a bronze medal in the four-man event at the 1965 FIBT World Championships in St. Moritz.

References
Bobsleigh four-man world championship medalists since 1930

American male bobsledders
Living people
Year of birth missing (living people)